NSS-6 is a communications satellite owned by SES WORLD SKIES.

NSS-6 covers the whole of Asia with six high-performance Ku band beams, which can deliver broadband media to small businesses, ISPs or domestic rooftop antennas in those markets. The satellite delivers Direct-To-Home power and performance, as well as significant inter-regional connectivity. High-gain uplink performance (i.e. high receiver G/T figures) allows the use of small uplink antennas and/or amplifiers.

 Manufacturer: Lockheed-Martin
 Original Orbital Location: 95° East
 Current Orbital Location: 86.85° West
 Launch date: December 17, 2002
 Launch Vehicle: Ariane 4
 Number of Transponders (physical): Ku band: 50
 Number of Transponders (36 MHz Equivalent): 60
 Saturated EIRP Range: Ku band: 44 to 55 dBW
 Frequency Band: Ku band uplink: 13.75 to 14.50 GHz
 Frequency Band: Ka band uplink: 29.5 to 30.0 GHz
 Frequency Band: Ku band downlink: 10.95 to 11.20 GHz, 11.45 to 11.70 GHz, 12.50 to 12.75 GHz

References

External links

 SES.com
 ITC Global uses NSS-6 for enterprise grade private networks in (e.g.) Australasia
 www.gilat.net

Lockheed Martin satellites and probes
Communications satellites in geostationary orbit
Spacecraft launched in 2002
SES satellites
NSS-06